Stefan Doniec (21 July 1908 – 26 July 2001) was a Polish footballer. He played in three matches for the Poland national football team in 1935.

References

External links
 

1908 births
2001 deaths
Polish footballers
Poland international footballers
Footballers from Kraków
Association football defenders
MKS Cracovia (football) players